Mvomeka'a is a village near Sangmélima, in Meyomessala subdivision, Dja-et-Lobo department, South Province, Cameroon. It is mostly known for being the native village of the current President Paul Biya.

References
"Paul Biya's Biography". 2004 Presidential Elections. Accessed 13 June 2007.

Populated places in South Region (Cameroon)